Benedetto Menzini (b. at Florence, 1646; d. at Rome, 7 September 1704) was an Italian Roman Catholic priest and poet. In his satires he assails in acrid terms the hypocrisy prevailing in Tuscany in the last years of the Medici rule.

Life

His family being poor, he early became a teacher, becoming a professor of belles-lettres at Florence and Prato. He was already in Holy Orders.

In 1681 he failed to obtain the chair of rhetoric in the University of Pisa, partly because of the jealousy of other clerics and partly because of the acrimony constantly shown by him in his words and acts. In 1685 he went to Rome and enjoyed the favour of Queen Christina of Sweden, until her death in 1689. Pope Innocent XII then gave him a canonry, and appointed him to a chair of rhetoric in one of the institutions of the city of Rome

Works

Following the models provided by the poems of Gabriello Chiabrera and Fulvio Testi, Menzini wrote his Pindaric "Canzoni eroiche e morali" (1674–80). These observe the Greek division - strophe, antistrophe, and deal with subjects that were also engaging the attention of the contemporary poet Filicaja, e.g., the defense of Vienna and the taking of Budapest from the Ottoman Turks.

Some seventeen of his elegies treat of matters of various interest. The poem "Il Paradiso terrestre" is almost continuation of the "Mondo creato" of Tasso, Menzini's favourite poet. In the "Academia Turculana" in mingled prose and verse, he introduces leading spirits of the time, who discuss subjects of many sorts.

The pastoral note was struck by him in his "Sonetti pastorali"; and in his "Canzonette anacreontiche" he produced a number of graceful little lyrics. As well as his satires, he lashes in his "Arte poetica" the artificiality and the uncouthness of the versifiers of his time.

References

Attribution
 The entry cites:
Opere (4 vols., Florence, 1731);
Satire (Amsterdam, 1728) and Borghini, III (1876);
Paolucci, Vita di Benedetto Menzini (FIorence, 1732);
Magrini, Studio critico su Benedetto Menzini (Naples, 1885);
Tonchini, Benedetto Menzini e le sue opere (Cairo, 1893).
Satire, rime e lettere scelte di Benedetto Menzini (Florence, 1874)

External links
 

1646 births
1704 deaths
17th-century Italian Roman Catholic priests
17th-century Italian writers
Italian poets
Italian male poets
Members of the Academy of Arcadians